Christian Giudicelli (27 June 1942 – 14 May 2022) was a French novelist and literary critic.
His seventh novel, Station balnéaire, was awarded the 1986 Prix Renaudot. Guidicelli was one of the eight jury members of the French literary award Prix Contrepoint.

Biography 
Giudicelli was born in Nîmes. He was a jury member of the Renaudot French literary prize since 1993. 

He contributed to literary publications including, La Nouvelle Revue française, Combat, Cahiers des saisons, La Quinzaine littéraire, Le Figaro Magazine, Écrivain magazine, as well as literary programs on France Culture.

His writing is intimate, sensitive and melancholy; he draws the material for his novels and stories from his own experiences, travels, and friendships. He lived in Paris since the early 1960s. However, his works are largely unread; his last book, in 2019, sold only 180 copies.

His close friendship with writer and accused paedophile Gabriel Matzneff is mentioned in his books, Les Spectre Joyeux and Gabriel infiniment aimable. He agreed to hide incriminating letters and photographs of Vanessa Springora for Matzneff, whom Springora accused of taking her as his lover when she was 14, according to Matzneff's writings. Giudicelli died of cancer in Paris at the age of 79 on 14 May 2022.

Bibliography
Le Jeune Homme à la licorne, Editions du Rocher 1966; reissue 1994
Une leçon particulière, Editions du Seuil 1968
Une poignée de sable, Editions du Seuil 1971
Mémoire d'un traducteur, Gallimard, 1974
Les Insulaires, Editions du Seuil, 1976; Collection Points-Roman, 1998
Une affaire de famille, Editions du Seuil, 1981; Collection Points-Roman 1984, Prix Valéry Larbaut
Le Point de fuite, 1984
Station balnéaire, Gallimard, 1986, Collection Folio 1988, Prix Renaudot
Double express, 1990
Quartier d'Italie, Editions du Rocher 1993, Collection Folio 1996
Jacques Noël, entretiens, 1993
Celui qui s'en va, Editions du Seuil, 1996
Fragments tunisiens, éditions du Rocher, 1998
Parloir, roman autobiographique, 2002
Karamel, théâtre, 2003
Après toi, 2004
Les Passants, 2007
Claude Verdier, peintre, 2007
Square de la Couronne, 2010

Theater
La Reine de la nuit, l'Avant-Scène, 1977
Le Chant du bouc, l'Avant-Scène, 1981
Première Jeunesse, Actes Sud-Papier, 1987
Les Lunatiques, 1993
Bon Baisers du Lavandou, Becasouille, 2000
Secret Défense de Jean-Paul Farré et Christian Giudicelli, directed by Anne-Marie Gros and Jean-Marie Lecoq, 2006

References

External links
http://culture-et-debats.over-blog.com/article-283042.html

1942 births
2022 deaths
French gay writers
French LGBT novelists
Deaths from cancer in France
20th-century French novelists
21st-century French novelists
20th-century French dramatists and playwrights
21st-century French dramatists and playwrights
Prix Renaudot winners
Prix Valery Larbaud winners
Prix Jean Freustié winners
People from Nîmes
French literary critics
French male novelists
20th-century French male writers
21st-century French male writers
French male non-fiction writers
French people of Italian descent
French LGBT dramatists and playwrights